Right to Clean Air Platform Turkey (RtCAP) is an independent non-governmental organisation exclusively focused on the issue of air pollution in Turkey.

Objectives

To protect public health RtCAP aims to clean up Turkey's air until it at least meets the World Health Organization's (WHO) recommended safe level.

In 2018 RtCAP published 10 policy recommendations for the government:

Reliably measure air pollution
Legislate to meet WHO air pollution guidelines
Include PM 2.5 in the above
Release more data to the public
Use up to date atmospheric dispersion modeling in environmental impact assessments
Introduce health impact assessment
Stop subsidizing fossil fuels 
Improve legislation to prevent and compensate for air pollution 
Promote alternatives to polluting activities 
Cooperate between government departments and also with NGOs and professional associations

Members
The members of the platform are: CAN Europe, General Practitioner Association of Turkey, Greenpeace Mediterranean, Green Peace Law Association, Green Thought Association, Health and Environment Alliance (HEAL), Physicians for Environment Association, TEMA Foundation (The Turkish Foundation for Combating Soil Erosion, for Reforestation and the Protection of Natural Habitats), Turkish Medical Association (TTB), Turkish Neurological Society, Turkish Respiratory Society, Turkish Society of Occupational Health Specialists (İMUD), Turkish Society of Public Health Specialists (HASUDER), Yuva Association, WWF Turkey, 350.org

Work
The platform follows on from Byzantine emperor Justinian I who acknowledged the importance of clean air in 535 AD, and the constitution of the Turkish republic which says that "It is the duty of the State and citizens to improve the natural environment, to protect the environmental health and to prevent environmental pollution.

Coal
In 2019 the platform lobbied parliamentarians to restrict pollution from coal fired power stations in Turkey, and carried out awareness raising and advocacy through the national press. Parliament later voted to restrict this pollution. They also campaign against Turkey's subsidies to coal.

Particulates
The platform is campaigning for Turkey to set a legal limit on the atmospheric fine particulates known as PM 2.5. They state that over 50,000 deaths could have been prevented in 2017 if PM2.5 had been below WHO guidelines.

References

External links 
 Air Quality Map (Turkish)
 2019 World Clean Air Congress in Istanbul

Environmental organizations based in Turkey
Pollution in Turkey
Medical and health organizations based in Turkey
2015 establishments in Turkey